The Labūnava Reservoir is an artificial lake in Kėdainiai District Municipality, central Lithuania. It was created in 1977, when a dam on the Barupė river had been built next to Labūnava village. In 2003, the dam was reconstructed and a small hydroelectric plant (of 160 kW) has been built. 
 
Shores of the reservoir are curvy, often grown by reed beds. The reservoir mostly is surrounded by agriculture lands, but a small section of the Labūnava Forest is located nearby. The water is used for irrigation.

References

Lakes of Kėdainiai District Municipality
Reservoirs in Lithuania